The Pearl Carpet of Baroda is a carpet that was commissioned by the Maharaja of Baroda.

History 
The carpet was commissioned by Khande Rao Gaekwad, the Maharaja of Baroda, in 1865. He intended to gift the carpet to adorn the Prophet's Tomb in Medina. However, the maharajah died in 1870 before the donation was made and the pearl carpet remained in his family. 

It was first exhibited in public at the Delhi Durbar in 1903, when it was still owned by the Gaekwad dynasty. The last Gaekwad royal to own it was Sita Devi who took it with her to Monaco in 1946.

The carpet made its second appearance in public when it was displayed in 1985 at the Metropolitan Museum in New York. At a Sotheby's auction in Doha in 2009, an anonymous buyer bought it for $5.5 million. It is now a part of the permanent collection of the National Museum of Qatar.

Design 
The carpet is embellished with pearls, diamonds, rubies and emeralds.

See also 

 Baroda

References

Notes

Citations

External links
 http://www.sothebys.com/en/auctions/2009/the-pearl-carpet-of-baroda-d09005.html
The Pearl Carpet of Baroda - Google Arts & Culture

Individual rugs and carpets
Collections of the National Museum of Qatar